Delta County is a county located in the U.S. state of Colorado. As of the 2020 census, the population was 31,196. The county seat is Delta.

History
Delta County was created by the Colorado legislature on February 11, 1883, out of portions of central Gunnison County.  The county was named from a delta of arable land at the mouth of the Uncompahgre River, where it flows into the Gunnison River.

Geography

Adjacent counties
Mesa County – northwest
Gunnison County – east
Montrose County – south

Major Highways
  U.S. Highway 50
  State Highway 65
  State Highway 92
  State Highway 133
  State Highway 348

National protected areas
Dominguez Canyon Wilderness
Dominguez-Escalante National Conservation Area (part)
Grand Mesa National Forest
Gunnison Gorge National Conservation Area (part)
Gunnison Gorge Wilderness
Gunnison National Forest

State protected areas
Crawford State Park
Sweitzer Lake State Park

Trails and byways
American Discovery Trail
Crag Crest National Recreation Trail
Old Spanish National Historic Trail
Grand Mesa Scenic and Historic Byway
West Elk Loop Scenic Byway

Demographics

At the 2000 census there were 27,834 people, 11,058 households, and 7,939 families living in the county.  The population density was 24 people per square mile (9/km2).  There were 12,374 housing units at an average density of 11 per square mile (4/km2).  The racial makeup of the county was 92.29% White, 0.52% Black or African American, 0.76% Native American, 0.32% Asian, 0.03% Pacific Islander, 4.25% from other races, and 1.83% from two or more races.  11.39% of the population were Hispanic or Latino of any race.
Of the 11,058 households 29.00% had children under the age of 18 living with them, 60.30% were married couples living together, 7.90% had a female householder with no husband present, and 28.20% were non-families. 24.80% of households were one person and 12.40% were one person aged 65 or older.  The average household size was 2.43 and the average family size was 2.89.

The age distribution was 24.00% under the age of 18, 6.30% from 18 to 24, 23.60% from 25 to 44, 26.50% from 45 to 64, and 19.70% 65 or older.  The median age was 42 years. For every 100 females there were 100.80 males.  For every 100 females age 18 and over, there were 98.60 males.

The median household income was $32,785 and the median family income was $37,748. Males had a median income of $31,348 versus $19,916 for females. The per capita income for the county was $17,152.  About 8.50% of families and 12.10% of the population were below the poverty line, including 15.00% of those under age 18 and 9.60% of those age 65 or over.

Communities

City
Delta

Towns
Cedaredge
Crawford
Hotchkiss
Orchard City
Paonia

Census Designated Place 

 Lazear

Unincorporated communities
Austin
Cory
Eckert

Politics 
Delta County votes predominantly Republican in national, state, and local elections. No Democratic presidential candidate has reached forty percent of Delta County's vote since Lyndon Johnson carried the county in 1964, and since 1920 Franklin D. Roosevelt in 1932 is the only other Democrat to gain a majority, although Roosevelt did win a plurality against Alf Landon in 1936.

Media
The local papers are the Delta County Independent and the Merchant Herald.

See also

Outline of Colorado
Index of Colorado-related articles
National Register of Historic Places listings in Delta County, Colorado
Delta County Libraries
Delta County Memorial Hospital

Notes

References

External links
Delta County Government website
Colorado County Evolution by Don Stanwyck
Colorado Historical Society
Delta Real Time Weather

 

 
Colorado counties
1883 establishments in Colorado
Populated places established in 1883